George W. "Chippy" Britt, also listed as George Britton and George Brittain (July 6, 1895 – February 13, 1972) was an American baseball player in the Negro leagues. He played with several teams from 1917 to 1945. He played every position.

References

External links
 and Baseball-Reference Black Baseball stats and Seamheads

Indianapolis ABCs players
Dayton Marcos players
Baltimore Black Sox players
Newark Dodgers players
Homestead Grays players
Baltimore Elite Giants players
Brooklyn Royal Giants players
Chicago American Giants players
Columbus Buckeyes players
Harrisburg Giants players
Hilldale Club players
Washington Black Senators players
Jacksonville Red Caps players
Cleveland Buckeyes players
1895 births
1972 deaths
20th-century African-American sportspeople